Malvidin-3-O-(6-p-coumaroyl)glucoside is a p-coumaroylated anthocyanin found in grape and wine. There are two forms with the cis and trans isomers of p-coumaric acid. It is a cation.

See also 
 Phenolic content in wine

References

External links 
 Malvidin 3-O-(6″-p-coumaroyl-glucoside) at phenol-explorer.eu

O-methylated anthocyanins